Salah ad-Din, or Salahu’d-Din, Ṣalāḥ ud-Dīn or other variant spellings, is an Arabic name that means The Righteousness of the Faith.

It commonly refers to An-Nasir Salah ad-Din Yusuf ibn Ayyub (Arabic: صلاح الدين يوسف بن أيوب), known as Saladin, the first sultan of Egypt and Syria and the founder of the Ayyubid dynasty.

Other notable people with the name, or known by the name, include (listed by nationality):

Middle East and Africa

Algeria 
Salaheddine Mokdad Saidi (born 1978), volleyball player

Central African Republic 
 Jean-Bédel Bokassa (1921–1996), military ruler, briefly known as Salah Eddine Ahmed Bokassa

Egypt 
Al-Ashraf Khalil (Al-Ashraf Salāh ad-Dīn Khalil issalahuddinbn Qalawūn, c. 1260s – 1293), Mamluk sultan
Salah Nasr (Salah ad-Din Nasr, 1920–1982), head of the Egyptian General Intelligence Directorate
Salah Jahin (Muhammad Salah Eldin Bahgat Ahmad Helmy, 1930–1986), writer and cartoonist
Salah al-Deen Hafez (1938–2008), writer and journalist
Walid Salah El-Din (born 1971), footballer
Mohamed Salah (football manager) (Mohamed Salah El-Din), footballer

Ethiopia
Saladin Said (born 1988), footballer
Saladin Bargicho (born 1994), footballer

Iraq 
Salah al-Din al-Sabbagh (1889–1945), Iraqi Army officer and Arab nationalist 
Salaheddine Bahaaeddin (born 1950), Kurdish-Iraqi politician
Salah Al-Deen Siamand (born 1981), Kurdish-Iraqi footballer
Qusay Salahaddin, murdered student

Jordan
Salah Suheimat (Salah al-Din Attallah Suheimat, 1914–1966), politician

Morocco 
Salaheddine Mezouar (born 1953), politician
Salaheddine Bassir (born 1972), footballer
Salahiddine Khlifi (born 1979), footballer
Salaheddine Aqqal (born 1984), footballer
Salaheddine Sbaï (born 1985), footballer
Salaheddine Saidi (born 1987), footballer
Salah Eddine Mraouni (born 1992), cyclist
Salahiddine Khlifi (born 1979), footballer

Sudan 
Ghazi Salah al-Din al-Atabani (born 1951), politician

Syria 
An-Nasir Yusuf (Salah al-Din Yusuf ibn al-Aziz ibn al-Zahir ibn Salah al-Din Yusuf ibn Ayyub ibn Shazy 1228–1260), Ayyubid Emir and Sultan
Salah al-Din al-Bitar (1912–1980), politician

Yemen
Al-Nasir Muhammad Salah al-Din (1338–1391), imam of Yemen

Asia

Afghanistan
Salahuddin Rabbani, politician

Bangladesh 
Salahuddin (film director) (1926–2003)
A. F. Salahuddin Ahmed (1924–2014), historian
Gazi Salahuddin (born 1984), cricketer
Kazi Salahuddin (born 1953), footballer
Sheikh Salahuddin (1969–2013), cricketer
 Salauddin Ahmed (born 1967), a contemporary architect
Salahuddin Ahmad, lawyer and Attorney General 2008–2009
Salahuddin Ahmed (governor), economist and governor of the Bangladesh Bank 2005–2009
Salahuddin Ahmed Mukti (born 1973), Bangladeshi politician 
Saleh Uddin (born 1954), architect, professor, author and artist
Salahuddin Quader Chowdhury (1949–2015), politician
Mohammad Salahuddin, cricket coach

Brunei 
Sallehuddin Damit (born 1973), footballer

India 
Sultan Salahuddin Owaisi (1931–2008), politician
Sayeed Salahudeen (Syed Mohammed Yusuf Shah, born 1946), a Kashmir separatist militant

Indonesia 
Salahuddin of Aceh, sultan 
Salahudin (born 1970), footballer and football manager
Salahuddin Wahid (born 1942), Islamic scholar and politician

Malaysia 
Raja Lumu (Salehuddin Shah ibni Almarhum Daeng Chelak, 1705–1778), Sultan of Selangor
Salahuddin of Selangor (Salahuddin Abdul Aziz Shah Al-Haj ibni Almarhum Sultan Hisamuddin Alam Shah Al-Haj, 1926–2001), head of state of Malaysia and Sultan of Selangor
Sallehuddin of Kedah (Al Aminul Karim Sultan Sallehuddin ibni Almarhum Sultan Badlishah, born 1942), Sultan of Kedah
Salahuddin Ayub (born 1961), politician
Abang Muhammad Salahuddin, governor of Sarawak
Izuan Salahuddin (born 1991), footballer

Maldives 
Husain Salahuddin (1881–1948), writer and scholar

Pakistan  
Salahuddin Mian (1938–2006), ceramic artist
Nawab Salahuddin Abbasi, politician and Ameer of Bahawalpur from 1988
Salahuddin (cricketer) (born 1947), cricketer
Salahuddin (cricketer, born 1998)
Salahuddin (wrestler) (Muhammad Salah-ud-din, born 1948) 
Salahuddin Toofani (1948–2008), actor and comedian
Ghazi Salahuddin (born 1939), journalist and scholar
Qazi Salahuddin (fl. 1960s), field hockey player 
Adil Salahuddin (born 1939), stamp designer
Ambreen Salahuddin (fl. 2000s), poet and author
Yousuf Salahuddin (born 1951), philanthropist and politician
Salahuddin Khan Mehsud, police officer
Salahuddin Panhwar (born 1966), judge 
Salahuddin Tirmizi (born 1943), politician 
Usman Salahuddin (born 1990), cricketer
Mooroo (Taimoor Salahuddin, fl. from 2011), rapper and musician
Masood Salahuddin (1915–2006), cricket umpire
Salahuddin Khan (fl. 2018), politician
 Shaikh Salahuddin, politician and National Assembly member 2008–2013 and 2018–
 Sheikh Salahuddin (politician) (born 1956)
 Nawabzada Farid Salahuddin (fl. 2018), politician

Thailand 
Salahudin Awae (born 1983), footballer

Europe
Louis Saladin, 17th-century French composer
Olivier Saladin (fl. from 1986), a French actor
Charles Saladin (1878–1942), French inventor of Saladin box
Paul Saladin Leonhardt (1877–1934), German chess master of Polish origins
Lorenz Saladin (1896–1936), Swiss mountain-climber, journalist, photographer and traveler
William Stewart Ross (1844–1906), Scottish writer who used the pseudonym "Saladin"

Americas
Bashir Salahuddin (born 1976), actor, writer and comedian
Dawud Salahuddin (born 1950), American Muslim assassin
Salahuddin Mustafa Muhammad, imam
Saladin Martin (born 1956), American footballer
Saladin Ahmed (born 1975), comic book and fantasy writer 
Abubakr Ben Ishmael Salahuddin (fl. 1990s), religious writer
Saladin K. Patterson, television writer and producer

See also
Saladin (disambiguation), for other uses including fictional characters
Selahattin, the Turkish version of the name

Salahuddin Ahmed (disambiguation)

Arabic masculine given names